Loch Venachar (Scottish Gaelic: Loch Bheannchair) is a freshwater loch in Stirling district, Scotland.

Geography 

The loch is situated between Callander and Brig o' Turk.

The Black Water discharges from Loch Achray into the western end of Loch Venachar, and at the eastern end emerges the Eas Gobhain which joins with the Garbh Uisge (River Leny) at Callander to form the River Teith. A small dam, which controls the water level, was built in the 19th century by John F. Bateman and is now a Listed building.''

An island in the loch, Portnellan island, is an Iron Age crannog and has been designated as a Scheduled Ancient Monument.

The south shore of the loch is covered by woodland containing numerous forest tracks, some leading over the hills to the Lake of Menteith and some leading westward along the loch to Loch Achray and the Trossachs. Invertrossachs House, which was visited by Queen Victoria in 1869, is also located on the south shore.

Leisure 

Venachar sailing club is accessible from the Invertrossachs private road. This sailing club uses the loch for regular racing events between March and October.

A brown trout stocking programme recommenced in 2016 under the management of the Loch Venachar Association and the loch also has stocks of pike, salmon, sea trout and perch. Fishing is available, by permit, from the shore and by boat.

References

External links

 Loch Venachar on “In Callander” website 
 Loch Venachar Sailing Club website

Lochs of Stirling (council area)
Freshwater lochs of Scotland
LVenachar
Trossachs